Cerynea is a genus of moths of the family Erebidae erected by Francis Walker in 1859.

Etymology
Cerynea is possibly derived from the hills of Cerynea, where Hercules performed the third labour (the capturing of the Cerynean Hind).

Species

References

Boletobiinae